New World Records is a record label that was established in 1975 through a Rockefeller Foundation grant to celebrate America's bicentennial (1976) by producing a 100-LP anthology, with American music from many genres.

In addition to this project, after 1978 New World produced new jazz by Roy Eldridge, Ricky Ford, Earl Hines, Steve Kuhn, Jay McShann, Jimmy Rushing, Buddy Tate, and Cecil Taylor.

New World has released over 400 albums by a variety of artists with diverse musical backgrounds, including jazz, classical music, experimental, popular song, and traditional music. Notable releases in the label's catalogue include the Grammy Award-winning releases of Samuel Barber's opera Antony and Cleopatra in 1984; Leonard Bernstein's operetta Candide in 1986; and Ned Rorem's String Symphony/Sunday Morning/Eagles in 1989.

New World's CRI and CRL catalog was transferred to the digital domain by George Blood Audio and Video of Philadelphia from 2006 to 2010.

References

External links
 Official site

Record labels established in 1975
Jazz record labels
American independent record labels
Experimental music record labels
Classical music record labels
1975 establishments in the United States